This is a list of large or well-known interstate or international companies headquartered in Kirkland, Washington.

Currently based in Kirkland
343 Industries (moving 2016)
Acumatica
ATG Stores
Appen (company)
bgC3
Bluetooth Special Interest Group
Cascade Investments (Bill Gates private family investment office)
Donuts
Echodyne
EvergreenHealth (Kirkland's top employer in 2010)
Griptonite Games
Icom Incorporated
INRIX
iSoftStone
Kenworth
Lancs Industries
LTC Financial Partners
Monolith Productions
Parabolica Press
RAD Game Tools
Tableau Software
Wave Broadband
 WaveDivision Holdings (parent company of Astound Broadband and Wave Broadband)
Ziply Fiber

Formerly based in Kirkland
Bungie (moved to Bellevue)
Clearwire (moved to Bellevue)
Costco (moved to Issaquah)
Hale's Ales (moved to Ballard in Seattle)
Seattle Seahawks (moved to Renton)
Terabeam (moved to San Jose)
Valve (moved to Bellevue)

Defunct
Amaze Entertainment
Cranky Pants Games
Lake Washington Shipyard
Lamonts
Onyx Software (acquired by Consona Corporation)
Teledesic
Wall Data

Branches based in Kirkland
GoDaddy
Google
Campus 2: Google has acquired several buildings in the new Kirkland Urban development
Campus 3: In Fall 2020, Google acquired the Lee Johnson Chevrolet block to build an additional small third campus within Kirkland

IBM (FileNet)
Salesforce

See also

References

Kirkland